William Moore Ede (31 August 1849 – 2 June 1935) was an Anglican priest in the 20th century.

Moore Ede was educated at Marlborough College and St John's College, Cambridge and ordained in 1873. After an early appointment as superintendent lecturer for the Midland Counties he held incumbencies at Gateshead and, from September 1901, Whitburn. He became Dean of Worcester Cathedral in 1908, a post he held for 26 years. He died on 2 June 1935.

Moore Ede wrote The attitude of The Church to some of the social problems of town life in 1896, which he dedicated to Professor Alfred Marshall, professor of economics at the University of Cambridge and the husband of the economist, Cambridge social reformer and Newnham College academic Mary Paley Marshall.

References

External links
 

1849 births
People educated at Marlborough College
Alumni of St John's College, Cambridge
Deans of Worcester
1935 deaths